L. W. (Joe) Gross (October 27, 1925 – August 2, 2004), was an American politician from the state of Iowa.

Gross was born October 27, 1925, in Fort Morgan, Colorado to Lester and Opal Gross. Joe's father Lester was a younger brother of H. R. Gross.  He graduated from Arispe High School in Arispe, Iowa in 1943. He was a Navy veteran of World War II. He married Helen Hammans in 1945. He served as a Republican in the Iowa House of Representatives from 1981 to 1983. Gross died August 2, 2004 in Mount Ayr, leaving behind his wife, two daughters and one son. He was interred in Rose Hill Cemetery in Mount Ayr, Ringgold County, Iowa.

References

1925 births
2004 deaths
People from Ringgold County, Iowa
Republican Party members of the Iowa House of Representatives
20th-century American politicians